The 2022 Chicago Red Stars season is the team's ninth season as a professional women's soccer team. Chicago plays in the National Women's Soccer League, the top tier of women's soccer in the United States.

Team

Management and staff

Competitions 
  

All times are in CT unless otherwise noted.

Regular season

Regular-season standings

Results summary

Results by matchday

Playoffs

Challenge Cup

Group stage

Central Division standings

Players 

Chicago has used a total of 24 players during the 2022 season, and there have been 12 different goal scorers. There have also been four squad members who have not made a first-team appearance in the campaign.

The team has scored a total of 28 goals in all competitions. Mallory Pugh, with 12 goals, is the highest scorer, followed by Amanda Kowalski and Bianca St-Georges, who have scored 3 goals each.

Key

No. = Squad number

Pos = Playing position

Nat. = Nationality

Apps = Appearances

GK = Goalkeeper

DF = Defender

MF = Midfielder

FW = Forward

 = Yellow cards

 = Red cards

Numbers under APPS indicate starts, and numbers in parentheses denote appearances as substitute. Players with name struck through and marked  left the club during the playing season.

Source:

References 

Chicago Red Stars
Chicago Red Stars
Chicago Red Stars
Chicago Red Stars
Chicago Red Stars seasons